Marjorie Anaïs Housepian Dobkin was an author and an English professor at Barnard College, Columbia University, New York. Her books include the novel A Houseful of Love (a  New York Times and New York Herald Tribune bestseller) and the history Smyrna 1922: The Destruction of a City.

Biography
Housepian Dobkin was born in 1922 to Dr. Moses Housepian and his wife Makrouhie Housepian (née Ashjian), Armenian immigrants in New York City, two and a half months after her grandfather was killed by a Turkish soldier during the burning of Smyrna from which her grandmother fled as a refugee. Her younger brother was the neurosurgeon Edgar Housepian. She attended Barnard College, graduating in 1944. She was a professor of literature and writing from 1957 to 1993, as well as associate dean of studies at Barnard from 1976 until 1993. Her students included the novelist Margaret Cezair-Thompson.

Her academic career included: instructor in English at Barnard College (1957–1988), associate dean of studies (1976–1993), professor of English (1988–1993), and 1993–2013: professor emerita (1993–2013).

She lived near Barnard at 425 Riverside Drive.

Awards and honors
She was awarded the Anania Shirakatsi prize of the Academy of Sciences of Soviet Armenia and was also the recipient of an honorary doctorate from Wilson College.

Bibliography
 A Houseful of Love (Random House, 1957)
 The Smyrna Affair (US version, Harcourt Brave Jovanovich, 1971; republished by Newmark Press under the title Smyrna 1922: The Destruction of a City)
 Smyrna 1922 (UK version, Faber and Faber, 1972)
 "The Unremembered Genocide" (article in Commentary)
 The Making of a Feminist: Early Journals and Letters of M. Carey Thomas (Kent State University Press, 1977)
 "George Horton and Mark L. Bristol: opposing forces in U.S. foreign policy, 1919–1923" (1983)
 Inside Out (written with Jean Cullen, Ivy Books, 1989)

References

External links

 Armenian Church website obituary notice. https://web.archive.org/web/20130816003635/http://www.armenianchurch-ed.net/news-and-media/news/marjorie-housepian-dobkin-1922-2013/]
 Article on Marjorie Housepian Dobkin in Eastern Armenian Wikipedia

1922 births
2013 deaths
American writers of Armenian descent
Columbia University faculty
Barnard College alumni
Educators from New York City
American women academics
21st-century American women